The 2007 Hall of Fame Tennis Championships (also known as the Campbell's Hall of Fame Tennis Championships for sponsorship reasons) was a men's tennis tournament played on outdoor grass courts. It was the 32nd edition of the Hall of Fame Tennis Championships, and was part of the International Series of the 2007 ATP Tour. It took place at the International Tennis Hall of Fame in Newport, Rhode Island, United States, from July 9 through July 15, 2007.

Finals

Singles

 Fabrice Santoro defeated  Nicolas Mahut 6–4, 6–4

Doubles

 Jordan Kerr /  Jim Thomas defeated  Nathan Healey /  Igor Kunitsyn 6–3, 7–5

External links
 
 Singles Draw
 Doubles Draw